A membrane transport protein (or simply transporter) is a membrane protein involved in the movement of ions, small molecules, and macromolecules, such as another protein, across a biological membrane. Transport proteins are integral transmembrane proteins; that is they exist permanently within and span the membrane across which they transport substances.  The proteins may assist in the movement of substances by facilitated diffusion or active transport. The two main types of proteins involved in such transport are broadly categorized as either channels or carriers. The solute carriers and atypical SLCs are secondary active or facilitative transporters in humans. Collectively membrane transporters and channels are known as the transportome.  Transportomes govern cellular influx and efflux of not only ions and nutrients but drugs as well.

Difference between channels and carriers
A carrier is not open simultaneously to both the extracellular and intracellular environments. Either its inner gate is open, or outer gate is open. In contrast, a channel can be open to both environments at the same time, allowing the molecules to diffuse without interruption. Carriers have binding sites, but pores and channels do not. When a channel is opened, millions of ions can pass through the membrane per second, but only 100 to 1000 molecules typically pass through a carrier molecule in the same time. Each carrier protein is designed to recognize only one substance or one group of very similar substances. Research has correlated defects in specific carrier proteins with specific diseases.

Active transport

 Active transport is the movement of a substance across a membrane against its concentration gradient. This is usually to accumulate high concentrations of molecules that a cell needs, such as glucose or amino acids. If the process uses chemical energy, such as adenosine triphosphate (ATP), it is called primary active transport. Secondary active transport involves the use of an electrochemical gradient, and does not use energy produced in the cell. Unlike channel proteins which only transport substances through membranes passively, carrier proteins can transport ions and molecules either passively through facilitated diffusion, or via secondary active transport. A carrier protein is required to move particles from areas of low concentration to areas of high concentration. These carrier proteins have receptors that bind to a specific molecule (substrate) needing transport. The molecule or ion to be transported (the substrate) must first bind at a binding site at the carrier molecule, with a certain binding affinity. Following binding, and while the binding site is facing the same way, the carrier will capture or occlude (take in and retain) the substrate within its molecular structure and cause an internal translocation so that the opening in the protein now faces the other side of the plasma membrane. The carrier protein substrate is released at that site, according to its binding affinity there.

Facilitated diffusion

Facilitated diffusion is the passage of molecules or ions across a biological membrane through specific transport proteins and requires no energy input. Facilitated diffusion is used especially in the case of large polar molecules and charged ions; once such ions are dissolved in water they cannot diffuse freely across cell membranes due to the hydrophobic nature of the fatty acid tails of the phospholipids that make up the bilayers.
The type of carrier proteins used in facilitated diffusion is slightly different from those used in active transport. They are still transmembrane carrier proteins, but these are gated transmembrane channels, meaning they do not internally translocate, nor require ATP to function. The substrate is taken in one side of the gated carrier, and without using ATP the substrate is released into the cell.

Reverse diffusion

Reverse transport, or transporter reversal, is a phenomenon in which the substrates of a membrane transport protein are moved in the opposite direction to that of their typical movement by the transporter. Transporter reversal typically occurs when a membrane transport protein is phosphorylated by a particular protein kinase, which is an enzyme that adds a phosphate group to proteins.

Types

(Grouped  by Transporter Classification database categories)

1: Channels/pores
 α-helical protein channels such as voltage-gated ion channel (VIC), ligand-gated ion channels(LGICs)
 β-barrel porins such as aquaporin
 channel-forming toxins, including colicins, diphtheria toxin, and others
 Nonribosomally synthesized channels such as gramicidin
 Holins; which function in export of enzymes that digest bacterial cell walls in an early step of cell lysis.

Facilitated diffusion occurs in and out of the cell membrane via channels/pores and carriers/porters.

Note:
 Channels:
Channels are either in open state or closed state. When a channel is opened with a slight conformational switch, it is open to both environment simultaneously (extracellular and intracellular)

Pores:
Pores are continuously open to these both environment, because they do not undergo conformational changes. They are always open  and active.

2: Electrochemical potential-driven transporters
Also named carrier proteins or secondary carriers.
 2.A: Porters (uniporters, symporters, antiporters), SLCs. 
Excitatory amino acid transporters (EAATs)
 EAAT1
 EAAT2
 EAAT3
 EAAT4
 EAAT5
 Glucose transporter
 Monoamine transporters, including:
 Dopamine transporter (DAT)
 Norepinephrine transporter (NET)
 Serotonin transporter (SERT)
 Vesicular monoamine transporters (VMAT)
 Adenine nucleotide translocator (ANT)
 2.B: Nonribosomally synthesized porters, such as:
 The Nigericin family
 The Ionomycin family
 2.C: Ion-gradient-driven energizers

3: Membrane transport protein
 3.A: P-P-bond-hydrolysis-driven transporters :
 ATP-binding cassette transporter (ABC transporter), such as MDR, CFTR
 V-type ATPase ; ( "V" related to vacuolar  ).
 P-type ATPase ; ( "P" related to phosphorylation), such as :
 Na+/K+-ATPase
 Plasma membrane Ca2+ ATPase
 Proton pump
F-type ATPase; ("F" related to factor), including: mitochondrial ATP synthase, chloroplast ATP synthase1
 3.B: Decarboxylation-driven transporters
 3.C: Methyltransfer-driven transporters
 3.D: Oxidoreduction-driven transporters
 3.E: Light absorption-driven transporters, such as rhodopsin

4: Group translocators 
The group translocators provide a special mechanism for the phosphorylation of sugars as they are transported into bacteria (PEP group translocation)

5: Electron carriers
The transmembrane electron transfer carriers in the membrane include two-electron carriers,  such as the disulfide bond oxidoreductases  (DsbB and DsbD in E.  coli)  as well as one-electron carriers such as NADPH oxidase. Often these redox proteins are not considered transport proteins.

Examples
Every carrier protein, especially within the same cell membrane, is specific to one type or family of molecules. For example, GLUT1 is a named carrier protein found in almost all animal cell membranes that transports glucose across the bilayer. Other specific carrier proteins also help the body function in important ways. Cytochromes operate in the electron transport chain as carrier proteins for electrons.

Pathology
A number of inherited diseases involve defects in carrier proteins in a particular substance or group of cells. Cysteinuria (cysteine in the urine and the bladder) is such a disease involving defective cysteine carrier proteins in the kidney cell membranes. This transport system normally removes cysteine from the fluid destined to become urine and returns this essential amino acid to the blood. When this carrier malfunctions, large quantities of cysteine remain in the urine, where it is relatively insoluble and tends to precipitate. This is one cause of urinary stones. Some vitamin carrier proteins have been shown to be overexpressed in patients with malignant disease. For example, levels of riboflavin carrier protein (RCP) have been shown to be significantly elevated in people with breast cancer.

See also
 Cotransport
 Cotransporter
 C14orf102, a 3810bp protein-encoding gene
 Ion channel
 Permease
 P-loop
 Solute carrier family (classification)
 TC number (classification)
 Translocase
 Vesicular transport protein
 Endocytosis

References

Anderle, P., Barbacioru,C., Bussey, K., Dai, Z., Huang, Y., Papp, A., Reinhold, W., Sadee, W., Shankavaram, U., & Weinstein, J. (2004).  Membrane Transporters and Channels:  Role of the Transportome in Cancer Chemosensitivity and Chemoresistance. Cancer Research, 54, 4294-4301.

External links

Transmembrane transporters